Dr. Seuss Baking Challenge is an American cooking competition television series hosted by Tamera Mowry-Housley. It premiered on Amazon Prime Video and Amazon Freevee on December 13, 2022.

Summary
In each episode, bakers are given a challenge to create foods based around Dr. Seuss characters and stories. Their creations are judged by pastry chefs Clarice Lam and Joshua John Russell, based on taste, creativity, and storytelling. The winner receives a $50,000 prize.

Contestants

 Daniel Santo Edwards
 Ashley Ball
 Rebecca Reed
 Cristina Vazquez
 Maya Hayes
 Alejandra Galan
 Huiwen Lu
 Kerrie Breuer
 Nikki Jessop
 Angel Figueroa
 Lorenzo Delgado
 Tareka Lofton
 Lily Sanchez
 Joyce Osorio
 Alene Paulk
 Chris Cwierz
 Angelo Satterwhite
 Kyle Smothers

Production
On March 17, 2022, it was announced that a Dr. Seuss-themed baking competition series was in development at Amazon Studios, and would also be produced by Dr. Seuss Enterprises and Super Delicious. This would be the first unscripted series based on the work of Dr. Seuss. On August 16, 2022, it was announced that the series had been greenlit by Amazon, with Tamera Mowry-Housley as host, and Clarice Lam and Joshua John Russell as judges. Ruth Amsel is showrunner and executive producer, and Cara Tapper, Adam Cohen, Joanna Vernetti, and Susan Brandt are also executive producers.

Release
The trailer for the series was released on November 16, 2022. All eight episodes of the series premiered on Amazon Freevee and Prime Video on December 13, 2022.

References

External links
 

2022 American television series debuts
2020s American cooking television series
Cooking competitions in the United States
English-language television shows
Amazon Prime Video original programming
Television series by Amazon Studios
Television shows based on works by Dr. Seuss